Scarborough Beach may refer to a beach in any of the following communities:

Scarborough Beach (Rhode Island), United States
Scarborough, Maine, United States
Scarborough, North Yorkshire, United Kingdom
Scarborough, Queensland, Australia
Scarborough, Western Australia
Scarborough Beach Road, an arterial road
Scarborough, Western Cape, South Africa